Cuisines of Uttarakhand are simple and made of locally grown ingredients. The cuisines don't have complex spices. The two regions in Uttarakhand have different cuisines, the Garhwali Cuisines and Kumaoni Cuisines. Some popular dishes of Uttarakhand cuisine are:

 Rabri (that made with Jhongora (shyama ka chawal) & Chaas (butter milk) adding leafs of Radish.)
 Khadi or jhwāi (made with Curd or buttermilk)
 Arsa (made with rice and jaggery)
 Gulthiya (made with normal atta & pure desi Ghee)
 Garhwal ka Fannah
 Muspani(Grounded urad)
 Dhapadi(Spinach soup)
 Stuffed Gahat Chapatis
 Gahat (Kulath) 
 Rasmi Badi (Kofta)
 Bhangjeera ki Chatni
 Chainsoo
 Kafuli
Kandali ku saag
 Urad Ke Pakore (Wada)
Aloo Ke Gutke
Rotna

References 

Uttarakhand
Uttarakhand-related lists
North Indian cuisine
Indian cuisine by state or union territory